The 2006–07 season was Hamburger SV's 44th professional season.

Season summary
Hamburg were rooted to the bottom of the table for the first half of the season, but the appointment of Huub Stevens revitalised the team and they rose to a final 7th-placed finish.

Players

First-team squad
Squad at end of season

Left club during season

Competitions

Bundesliga

League table

Matches

DFB Cup

UEFA Champions League

Qualifying round

Group stage

Transfers

In

Out

Statistics

Kits

References

Notes

Hamburger SV seasons
German football clubs 2006–07 season